The Standard Steam Car was an American steam car manufactured by the Standard Engineering Company of St Louis, Missouri from 1920 until 1921.

History 
L. L. Scott and E. C. Newcomb developed a steam car claimed to be able to raise a full head of steam within a minute.  . Also known as the Scott-Newcomb, it featured a front condenser that resembled a Rolls-Royce shaped radiator and was similar in appearance to the Roamer. The car had a twin-cylinder horizontal steam engine and used kerosene for fuel. The boiler pressure was stated as 600psi.

The Scott-Newcomb Motor Car Company was formed for production but only one touring car is known to have been built; the company may have produced as many as five vehicles before folding.

A 3-page article from 1920 on technical aspects of the Standard Steam Car appears in Floyd Clymer's Historical Motor Scrapbook, Steam Car Edition, published in 1945.

External links 

 Standard Engineering at the VirtualSteamCarMuseum

References

 

Defunct motor vehicle manufacturers of the United States
Cars introduced in 1920
Companies based in St. Louis
Vehicle manufacturing companies established in 1920
Vehicle manufacturing companies disestablished in 1921
1920 establishments in Missouri
1920s disestablishments in Missouri
Defunct manufacturing companies based in Missouri
Steam cars
1920s cars